Paris Cemetery is located along South Main Street (US 68 Bus.) in Paris, Kentucky, United States. Incorporated on January 30, 1847, the cemetery is owned and operated by the Paris Cemetery Company. When it first opened, many families re-interred their dead in the new cemetery. 

Many of the grave markers within the cemetery, namely those from the 19th and early 20th centuries, are made of marble or similar materials. While not as durable as granite (most commonly used today), marble is softer, and thus lends itself to more elaborate designs. Most of the decorative monuments at the cemetery are carved from marble. Victorian Era angels are common in the cemetery, as are obelisks; both were also popular grave monuments during the 19th century.  
 
The cemetery is the burial place of many prominent Kentuckians, and includes the Bourbon County Confederate Monument and a gatehouse, both of which are listed on the U.S. National Register of Historic Places. There are also monuments on the grounds honoring those from Bourbon County who fought in: the Mexican–American War; World War I; along with a combined World War II, Korean War, and the Vietnam War Memorial.

The Bourbon County Confederate Monument, located in the middle of the cemetery, was built by the Confederate Monument Association in 1887. Like many monuments to the Confederate States of America in Kentucky, it is an obelisk, but is unique for being built like a chimney. On the rear of the monument is a list of all those from Bourbon County who died fighting for the Confederacy in the Civil War, or those serving the Confederacy who died in Bourbon County.

On July 17, 1997, it was one of sixty-one different monuments to the Civil War in Kentucky placed on the National Register of Historic Places, as part of the Civil War Monuments of Kentucky Multiple Property Submission.

The Paris Cemetery gatehouse, made of granite, is also on the National Register, placed there on November 24, 1978. The cemetery was founded in 1847, with the gatehouse finished in 1862 by architect John McMurtry.

Notable persons buried at Paris Cemetery include:
 Bill Arnsparger (1926–2015), NFL and college football coach.
 Virgil Chapman (1895–1951), represented Kentucky in the U.S. House of Representatives and in the U.S. Senate.
 Blanton Collier (1906–1983), NFL and college football coach.
 John T. Croxton (1836–1874), brigadier general in the Union Army during the Civil War, and later U.S. Minister to Bolivia.
 Garrett Davis (1801–1872), represented Kentucky in the U.S. House and in the U.S. Senate.
 John Fox Jr. (1862–1919), journalist, short story writer and novelist.
 Arthur B. Hancock (1875–1957), breeder of Thoroughbred racehorses who established Claiborne Farm.
 Arthur B. Hancock Jr. (1910–1972), breeder of thoroughbred racehorses.
 Richard Hawes (1797–1877), represented Kentucky in the U.S. House and served as the second Confederate governor of Kentucky.
 Basil Hayden (1899–2003), college basketball player and coach.
 Hattie Hutchcraft Hill (1847–1921), artist most known for her still-life, portrait, landscape and marine oil works.
 Alexander D. Orr (1761–1835), first representative from  following the commonwealth's admission to the Union.
 William E. Simms (1822–1898), represented Kentucky in the U.S. House and then as senator in the Confederate States Congress.
 Robert Trimble (1776–1828), Associate Justice of the Supreme Court of the United States.

References

Cemeteries on the National Register of Historic Places in Kentucky
1847 establishments in Kentucky
National Register of Historic Places in Bourbon County, Kentucky
Civil War Monuments of Kentucky MPS
Confederate States of America monuments and memorials in Kentucky
Paris, Kentucky
Gatehouses (architecture)